Pierre Georges Louis Capdeville (30 October 1899 – 24 February 1991) was a football referee from France, who controlled the 1938 FIFA World Cup Final in Paris between Italy and Hungary. He is the only referee to have officiated in a World Cup final in his native country.

Capdeville was the referee in the French Cup final in 1936 in the game between Racing Club of Paris and Charleville, and was also in charge of the Yugoslavia versus England match during the Football Association's last European tour before the outbreak of the Second World War.

References 

1899 births
1991 deaths
French football referees
1938 FIFA World Cup referees
FIFA World Cup Final match officials